Monstrilla is a genus of copepods in the family Monstrillidae.

References

External links 

Copepod genera
Parasitic crustaceans